The Buckfever Underground is a South African folk/punk/art band formed in 1997 by Toast Coetzer and Gil Hockman. They have English as well as Afrikaans songs. Their single "Die Volk (is in die kak)" from the 1998 debut album Jou medemens is dood was featured in the top 100 best protest songs ever in a Dutch survey. The band's third studio album, Saves, was included in lists of South Africa top ten South African albums of the decade 2000 - 2010  by both The Mail & Guardian and Die Beeld newspapers.

Band members 
Toast Coetzer: vocals, lyrics
Gil Hockman: bass / guitar
 Jon Savage: bass 
 Stephen Timm: drums 
 Righard Kapp: guitar
Michael Currin: guitar

Discography 
Jou Medemens Is Dood (1998)
TAFL - Teaching Afrikaans as a Foreign Language (2003)
 Saves (2007)
 Limbs Gone Batty (2009)
 Verkeerdevlei (2012)
The Last Days of Beautiful (2019)

References

External links
 The Buckfever Underground Official Website

Folk punk groups
South African punk rock groups
1997 establishments in South Africa
Musical groups established in 1997